Ypsilanti Community High School is a public high school located near Ypsilanti, Michigan. The school is the main high school in the Ypsilanti Community Schools district.

History 
Ypsilanti Community High School was founded in 2013 as part of the merger of Willow Run Community Schools and the Ypsilanti Public School District into Ypsilanti Community Schools. YCHS is the successor to Ypsilanti High School and Willow Run High School, using the Ypsilanti High School building which had opened in 1973.

References

Public high schools in Michigan
Schools in Washtenaw County, Michigan
Ypsilanti, Michigan